Smithfield is an unincorporated community in Liberty Township, Delaware County, Indiana.

History
Smithfield was founded in 1830. A post office was established at Smithfield in 1830, and remained in operation until it was discontinued in 1856.

Geography

References

Unincorporated communities in Delaware County, Indiana
Unincorporated communities in Indiana
1830 establishments in Indiana